William Griffith McBride CBE AO (25 May 1927 – 27 June 2018) was an Australian obstetrician. He published a letter on the teratogenicity of thalidomide following the findings of a midwife named Pat Sparrow, which resulted in the reduction of the number of drugs prescribed during pregnancy. Later in his life, McBride was found guilty of separate counts of medical malpractice and scientific fraud for falsifying data in a paper that claimed that the drug Debendox was also responsible for birth defects.

Biography
McBride was born in Sydney, Australia.

Thalidomide case
McBride published a letter in The Lancet, in December 1961, noting a large number of birth defects in children of patients who were prescribed thalidomide, after a midwife named Sister Pat Sparrow first suspected the drug was causing birth defects in the babies of patients under his care at Crown Street Women's Hospital in Sydney. Using the prize money, he established Foundation 41, a Sydney-based medical research foundation concerned with the causes of birth defects. Working with P H Huang, he proposed that thalidomide caused malformations by interacting with the DNA of the dividing embryonic cells. This finding stimulated their experimentation, which showed that thalidomide may inhibit cell division in rapidly dividing cells of malignant tumors. This work was published in the journal "Pharmacology and Toxicology" in 1999 and has been rated in the top ten of the most important Australian medical discoveries.

Debendox case
McBride's involvement in the Debendox case is less illustrious. In 1981, he published a paper indicating that the drug Debendox (marketed in the US as Bendectin) caused birth defects. His co-authors noted that the published paper contained manipulated data and protested but their voices went unheard. Multiple lawsuits were filed by patients, and McBride was a willing witness for the claimants. Eventually, the case was investigated and, as a result, McBride was struck off the Australian medical register in 1993 for deliberately falsifying data. An inquiry determined "we are forced to conclude that McBride did publish statements which he either knew were untrue or which he did not genuinely believe to be true, and in that respect was guilty of scientific fraud." He was reinstated to the medical register in 1998.

The Bendectin case, and the subsequent removal of the drug from the US market, has had a number of consequences. Firstly, there was an immediate increase in the rates of hospitalization for nausea and vomiting in pregnancy. Secondly, it created a treatment void in terms of having a safe medication that could be used for alleviating morning sickness in US pregnant women, a condition which, in the most severe form, called hyperemesis gravidarum, could be both life-threatening and cause women to terminate their pregnancy. The removal from the market of a safe and effective drug for the treatment of nausea and vomiting of pregnancy resulted in the use of other, less studied drugs in pregnancy. Thirdly, it has been claimed that subsequent to the Bendectin experience, drug companies stayed away from developing medications for pregnant patients. As a result, only a few medications were approved by the FDA for obstetrical indications in the past several decades. Lastly, the perception that all medications are teratogenic increased among pregnant women and healthcare professionals.

The unfounded fear of using medications during pregnancy has precluded many women from receiving the treatment they require. Leaving medical conditions untreated during pregnancy can result in adverse pregnancy outcomes or significant morbidity for both the mother and baby. Ongoing education of physicians and the general public has resulted in improvements in the perception of medication use in pregnancy; however, further advances are required to overcome the devastating effects of the Bendectin saga.

Honours
McBride was nominated Man of the Year for 1962, a Commander of the Order of the British Empire (1969 Birthday Honours), Father of the Year (1972) and an Officer of the Order of Australia (1977 Silver Jubilee and Queen's Birthday Honours).

Personal life 

McBride had four children, one of whom is the soldier, lawyer, television presenter and whistleblower, David McBride.

Death
McBride died, aged 91, on 27 June 2018.

See also 
 List of scientific misconduct incidents

References

External links
 1986 Portrait of William McBride – National Library of Australia

1927 births
2018 deaths
Australian obstetricians
Australian Commanders of the Order of the British Empire
Officers of the Order of Australia
People educated at Canterbury Boys' High School
People involved in scientific misconduct incidents
Sydney Medical School alumni